List of programs broadcast by Star TV, a Turkish nationwide TV channel owned by Ferit Şahenk from Doğuş Media Group since 2011.

Current programming

Series
 2021–: Sana Söz Salı 20.00 Yapim 03 Medya
 2021–: Kaderimin Oyunu Cuma 20.00 Yapim Ngm Television
 2021–: Annemizi Saklarken Çarşamba 20.00 Yapim Ojo Pictures
 2021–: Hanedan Pazartesi 20.00 Yapim Ay Yapim
 2021–: Cennet Köyü Pazar 20.00 Yapim 03 Medya
 2021–: Masum ve Güzel 16 Aralık Perşembe Yapim Nyc Medya
 2021–: Kral Kaybederse 18 Aralık Cumartesi Yapim Ogm Pictures

Life style
 2012–: Tülin Şahin'le Moda (Tülin Şahin)
 2015–: Vahe ile Evdeki Mutluluk (Vahe Kılıçarslan)
 2016–: Özlem Denizmen'le Kadınca
 2017–: Mesut Yar Sunar (Mesut Yar)
 2019–: Kocam Yaparsa
 2019–: Nursel'in Konukları
 2021–: Haluk Levent'le Yeniden

Magazine
 2014–: Star Life
 2013–: En güzel bölüm

News
 1989–: Ece Belen Atrek ile Yaz Haberleri (Ece Belen Atrek)
 1989–: Star Ana Haber (Nazlı Çelik Bilgili)

Former programming

Series

1991–1995
 Yadigar
 1991–1992: Ana
 1991: Kimse Durduramaz
 1991: Karışık İş
 1991: Karşı Show
 1991: Kahraman Damat
 1991: Portatif Hüseyin
 1991: Şen Dullar
 1992: Taşların Sırrı
 1992: Kızlar Yurdu
 1992: Savcı
 1992: Saygılar Bizden
 1993: Şaban Askerde
 1994–1998: Yazlıkçılar
 1994: Sevgi Oyunu
 1994–1995: Bay Kamber
 1994–1999: Bizimkiler
 1995: Aşk Fırtınası
 1995: Fırıldak Nuri
 1995: Aşık Oldum
 1995: Aşk ve Gurur
 1995: Evdekiler
 1995: Gül ve Diken
 1995: Gölge Çiçeği
 1995: Kanundan Kaçılmaz / İz Peşinde
 1995: Kaygısızlar
 1995: Kopgel Taksi
 1995: Muhteşem Zango
 1995–1997: Şehnaz Tango
 1995–1999: Ferhunde Hanımlar

1996–2000
 1996: Çılgın Badiler
 1996: Komşu Komşu
 1996: Şeytanın Kurbanları
 1996: Oğlum Adam Olacak
 1996: Sihirli Ceket
 1996: Süper Yıldız
 1996: Tam Pansiyon
 1996: Tutku
 1996: Zühre
 1996–1997: Fırtınalar
 1996–1997: Gözlerinde Son Gece
 1997: Acı Günler
 1997: Baskül Ailesi
 1997: Canısı
 1997: Devlerin Aşkı
 1997–1998: Fırat
 1997: İntizar
 1997: Köstebek
 1997: Oyun Bitti
 1997: Yangın Ayşe
 1997–1998: Yerim Seni
 1997–1998: Deli Divane
 1997–1998: Sırtımdan Vuruldum
 1997–2000: Kara Melek
 1998: Can ile Muhlise
 1998: Çarli
 1998: Dış Kapının Mandalları
 1998: Feride
 1998: Gülüm
 1998: Hain Geceler
 1998: Hesabım Bitmedi
 1998: Hicran
 1998: Kaygısızlar
 1998: Kızım Osman
 1998: Mercan Kolye
 1998: Sır Dosyası
 1998–1999: Kuzgun
 1998–1999: Güzel Günler
 1998–1999: Reyting Hamdi
 1998–1999: Sen Allah'ın Bir
 1998–1999: Yıkılmadım
 1998–2001: Aynalı Tahir
 1998–2003: Üvey Baba
 1999: Affet Beni
 1999: Bizim Sokak
 1999: Güneş Yanıkları
 1999: Kadınlar Kulübü
 1999: Zilyoner
 1999: Küçük Besleme
 1999–2004: Bücür Cadı
 1999–2000: Kıvılcım
 2000: Aşk Hırsızı
 2000: Birisi / Her Şey Yalan
 2000: Hanım Ağa
 2000: Kızım ve Ben
 2000: Koltuk Sevdası
 2000: Kör Talih
 2000: Süper Kurşunsuz
 2000: Mercan Kolye
 2000: Renkli Dünyalar

2001–2005
 2001: Küçük Besleme
 2001: Aylin
 2001: Babam ve Biz
 2001–2002: Sultan
 2001: Tuzu Kurular
 2002: Kara Melek
 2002: Ah Yaşamak Var ya
 2002: Asayiş Berkemal
 2002: Aşk ve Gurur
 2002: Beşik Kertmesi
 2002: Bizimkiler
 2002: Cabbar
 2002: Çatıdaki Kız
 2002: Aşkın Peşinde
 2002: Dadı
 2002: Efsane
 2002: Emanet
 2002: Kader Ayırsa Bile
 2002: Kibar Ana
 2002: Mahallenin Muhtarları
 2002: Teyzemin Nesi Var
 2002: Vaka-i Zaptiye
 2003: Bir Yıldız Tutuldu
 2003: Şıhsenem
 2003: Umutların Ötesi
 2003: Zalim
 2003: Hürrem Sultan
 2003–2004: Ayrılsak da Beraberiz
 2003–2004: Çocuklar Duymasın
 2003–2006: En Son Babalar Duyar
 2004: 24 Saat
 2004: Biz Boşanıyoruz
 2004: Her Şey Yolunda
 2004: Tatil Aşkları
 2004: Yeni Hayat
 2004–2005: Çocuklar Ne Olacak
 2004–2005: Kadın İsterse
 2004–2005: Sırlara Yolculuk
 2004–2005: Şöhretler Kebapçısı
 2005: AB'nin Yolları Taştan
 2005: Alanya Almanya
 2005: Canın Sağolsun
 2005: Erkek Tarafı
 2005: Kayıt Dışı
 2005: Kısmet Değilmiş
 2005: Kızma Birader
 2005: Sen misin Değil misin
 2005: Yeniden Çalıkuşu

2006–2010
 2006: İmkansız Aşk
 2006: Karagümrük Yanıyor
 2006: Taşların Sırrı
 2006: Ümit Milli
 2006–2007: Candan Öte
 2006–2007: Kaybolan Yıllar
 2006–2007: Yalancı Yarim
 2006–2008: İki Aile
 2006–2008: Köprü
 2006: Sihirli Annem (Kanal D)
 2007: Acemi Cadı (Kanal D.)
 2007: Kader
 2007: Sevgili Dünürüm
 2007: Ters Yüz
 2007: Zeliha'nın Gözleri
 2007: Leylan
 2007–2008: Çemberin Dışında (Show TV)
 2007–2008: Fedai
 2007–2009: Vazgeç Gönlüm
 2008: Kalpsiz Adam
 2008: Milyonda Bir
 2008: Derdest
 2008: Pulsar
 2008: Son Ağa
 2008–2009: Ay Işığı
 2008–2009: Baba Ocağı
 2008–2009: Son Bahar
 2008–2009: Güldünya
 2009: Aile Reisi
 2009: Teyzanne
 2009: İstanbul'un Çocukları
 2009–2010: İhanet
 2009: Kayıp Prenses
 2009: Kül ve Ateş
 2009: Yol Arkadaşım
 2009–2010: Benim Annem Bir Melek
 2009–2010: Kurtlar Vadisi Pusu
 2009–2010: Makber
 2009–2010: Maskeli Balo
 2009–2011: Papatyam
 2010: Cümbür Cemaat Aile
 2010: Umut Yolcuları
 2010–2011: Dürüye'nin Güğümleri
 2010–2011: Geniş Aile
 2010–2011: Küçük Kadınlar
 2010–2011: Küçük Sırlar
 2010–2013: Behzat Ç. Bir Ankara Polisiyesi

2011
 2011: Anneler ile Kızları
 2011: Ay Tutulması
 2011: Cennetin Sırları
 2011: İzmir Çetesi
 2011: Sırat
 2011: Yalancı Bahar
 2011–2012: Akasya Durağı
 2011–2012: Sihirli Annem
 2011–2012: Bir Ömür Yetmez
 2011–2012: Firar
 2011–2012: İffet
 2011–2012: İkinci Bahar (1998–2001, atv)
 2011–2012: Tek Başımıza

2012
 2012: Acayip Hikayeler
 2012: Ağır Roman Yeni Dünya
 2012: Babalar ve Evlatlar
 2012: Bir Çocuk Sevdim
 2012: Canımın İçi
 2012: Çıplak Gerçek
 2012: Evlerden Biri
 2012: Hayatımın Rolü
 2012: İbreti Ailem
 2012: Kalbim 4 Mevsim
 2012: Koyu Kırmızı
 2012: Küçük Hesaplar
 2012: Sudan Bıkmış Balıklar
 2012–2013: Bir Erkek Bir Kadın
 2012–2013: Dila Hanım
 2012–2013: İşler Güçler
 2012–2014: Muhteşem Yüzyıl

2013
 2013: 20 Dakika
 2013: Benim Hala Umudum Var (FOX'a geçti.)
 2013–2014: Ben de Özledim
 2013–2015: Aramızda Kalsın
 2013–2015: Aşkın Bedeli
 2013–2015: Medcezir

2014
 2014: Aşktan Kaçılmaz
 2014: Kaçak Gelinler
 2014: Kurt Seyit ve Şura
 2014: Reaksiyon
 2014: Sil Baştan
 2014: Urfalıyam Ezelden
 2014–2015: Deniz Yıldızı
 2014–2015: Gönül İşleri
 2014–2015: Güzel Köylü
 2014–2015: Kaderimin Yazıldığı Gün
 2014–2015: Kardeş Payı
 2014–2017: Paramparça

2015
 2015: Çilek Kokusu
 2015: Serçe Sarayı
 2015: Tatlı Küçük Yalancılar
 2015–2016: Hatırla Gönül
 2015–2016: Muhteşem Yüzyıl Kösem
 2015–2017: Kiralık Aşk
 2015–2017: Kara Sevda
 2015 : Tatli Küçük Yalançilar

2016
 2016: 46 Yok Olan
 2016: Gecenin Kraliçesi
 2016: Göç Zamanı
 2016: Hanım Köylü
 2016: Şahane Damat
 2016: Yüksek Sosyete
 2016–2017: Hayat Bazen Tatlıdır
 2016–2017: Anne
 2016–2017: Cesur ve Güzel

2017
 2017: Ateşböceği
 2017: Dolunay
 2017: İçimdeki Fırtına
 2017: Türk Malı
 2017: Yıldızlar Şahidim
 2017–2018: Fazilet Hanım Ve Kızları
 2017–2018: Hayat Sırları
 2017–2018: Siyah İnci
 2017–2019: Söz
 2017–2019: İstanbullu Gelin

2018
 2018: Babamın Günahları
 2018: Börü
 2018: Kalbimin Sultanı
 2018–2019: Erkenci Kuş
 2018–Present: Avlu (“The Yard” On Netflix)

2019
 2019: Kardeş Çocukları 2019: Kuzgun 2019: Sevgili Geçmiş 2019: Benim Tatlı Yalanım2020
 2020: Sol Yanım 2020: Menajerimi Ara''

2021
 2021: “Seni Çok Bekledim”
 2021: “Kağıt Ev”
 2021: "Kazara Aşk"
 2021: "Benim Hayatim"
 2021: "Ada Masali"

Other TV series
 1990–1995: Kanun Namına (dizi) (TRT 1'den geldi.)
 1990–1995: Kara Şimşek (TRT 1'den geldi.)
 1990–1995: Macgyver (TRT 1'den geldi.)
 1990–1995: A Takımı (Kanal 7')
 1990–1992: Dallas (TRT 1, Show TV.)
 1990–1995: Hanedan(Dynasty)
 Knots Landing (TRT 1, Show TV'i.)
 Hawaii Five-O (TRT 1'den geldi, Show TV'ye geçti.)
 San Fransisko Sokakları (TRT 1)
 1990–1992: Ateş Çemberi
 1990–1992: Aynadaki Yüz
 1990–1992: Bütün Çocuklarım
 1990–1992: Evli ve Çocuklu (atv)
 1990–1992: Hastane Günlüğü
 1990–1992: Uçak Gemisi
 990–1995: Dynasty
 1990–1995: Santa Barbara (TRT 1.)
 1990–1998: Cesur ve Güzel (Show TV)
 1991–1992: Beverly Hills, 90210 (Kanal D)
 -1996: Marimar
 1998: Maria la del Barrio
 2007–2008: Rosalinda (atv)
 2009–2010: Büyük Kaçış (Original broadcast: CNBC-e
 2010: 24 (Original broadcast: CNBC-e
 2010–2011: Aşkın İki Yüzü
 2011: Kalbimin Sahibi
 2012: CSI: NY (Original broadcast: CNBC-e)
 2012: Dallas (came from Elmax, switched to CNBC-e )
 2012: Genç Kurt (Original broadcast: CNBC-e )
 2012: Hayallerin Peşinde (e2)
 2012: Merlin (Original broadcast: CNBC-e )
 2012: Spartaküs: Arenanın İlahları (Original broadcast: CNBC-e )
 2012: Spartaküs: İntikam (Original broadcast: CNBC-e )
 2012: Spartaküs: Kan ve Kum (Original broadcast: CNBC-e )
 2012: Taht Oyunları (Original Release: Cine5, Universal Channel and CNBC-e
 2012–2013: Law & Order  (original publication : 2012–present, CNBC-e )
 2012–2013: Revolution (Orijinal yayın: 2012-günümüz, CNBC-e)
 2012–2013: Sinbad
 2013: Titanic

Cinema
 1990–2012: Star TV Yabancı Film
 2009: Star Sinema Kulübü
 2012: Kült Türk Filmleri Kuşağı
 2012: Star TV Düşler Sinem

Award
 1995–2005: Kral TV Video Müzik Ödülleri
 2006–2011: Altın Kelebek Ödülleri
 2012: Kral TV Video Müzik Ödülleri
 2013: Türkiye Müzik Ödülleri

Music-Entertainment
 1991–1993: Laf Lafı Açıyor (Show TV)
 1991–1994: Salı Pazarı (Defne Samyeli)
 1994: Maksat Muhabbet (Kadir Çöpdemir)
 1994–1996: İbo Show (İbrahim Tatlıses)
 1998: Cumartesi Gecesi Ateşi (Şebnem Dönmez)
 1998: Deniz Show (Özcan Deniz)
 2000–2001: Beyaz Show (Beyazıt Öztürk)
 2000–2003: İbo Show (İbrahim Tatlıses)
 2001–2002: Denizkızı (Deniz Akkaya)
 2002: Sibel Can – Ata Demirer Show (Sibel Can ve Ata Demirer)
 2002: Tatlı ve Huysuz Show (Huysuz Virjin ve Sibel Can)
 2004–2005: İbo Show (İbrahim Tatlıses)
 2005–2006: Mesut Yar'la Tuhaf Şeyler (Mesut Yar)
 2007–2009: Kliptonik (Kerem Özşeker)
 2009–2010: İbo Show (İbrahim Tatlıses)
 2010: Dr. Öz Show (Mehmet Öz)
 2010: Petek'le 10 Numara (Petek Dinçöz)
 2010–2011: Hayrettin (Hayrettin Karaoğuz)
 2011: Bu Şarkı İkimizin (Deniz Seki ve Yavuz Bingöl)
 2011: Matrax (Zeki Kayahan Coşkun)
 2011: Pişti (Gani Müjde, Şafak Sezer, Özlem Tekin ve Sanem Altan)
 2011: Yerden Göğe (Berna Laçin, Funda Özkalyoncuoğlu ve Rasim Ozan Kütahyalı)
 2013–2014: 3 Adam (Eser Yenenler, Oğuzhan Koç ve İbrahim Büyükak)
 2014–2016: Dada Dandinista (Okan Bayülgen)

References

Star TV (Turkey) original programming
Lists of television series by network
Original programming by Turkish television network or channel